Haute may refer to:

People
 Nicholas Haute (1357 – c.1415), English knight, landowner and politician
 William Haute (MP) (1390-1462), son of Nicholas, Member of Parliament, English politician
 William Hawte or Haute (c. 1430 - 1497), son of William, composer, involved in the Wars of the Roses

Music
"Haute" (song), by Tyga, 2019

See also

Terre Haute (disambiguation)